is a former Japanese volleyball player.

She competed at the 2004 Summer Olympics in Athens, Greece. There she ended up in fifth place with the Japan women's national team. Narita played as a wing-spiker. She was named Best Digger and Best Receiver at the 2004 FIVB Women's World Olympic Qualification Tournament.

Clubs
AsahikawaJitsugyo High School → NEC Red Rockets (1994–2001) → Hisamitsu Springs (2003–2007) → NEC Red Rockets (2007–2010) → Pioneer Red Wings (2009–2011)

Honours
1996: 9th place in the Olympic Games
1998: 8th place in the World Championship
1999: 6th place in the World Cup
2004: 5th place in the Olympic Games

Individual awards
1997 3rd V.League : Servereceive award, Best 6
1998 4th V.League : Excellent Player award, Servereceive award, Best 6
1999 5th V.League : Best 6
2000 6th V.League : Excellent Player award, Best 6
2001 7th V.League : Servereceive award, Best 6
 2004 Olympic Qualifier "Best Digger"
 2004 Olympic Qualifier "Best Receiver"
2006 12th V.League : Receive award
2007 2006-07 V.Premier League : Receive award

References

External links
 FIVB biography

1976 births
Living people
Japanese women's volleyball players
Volleyball players at the 1996 Summer Olympics
Volleyball players at the 2004 Summer Olympics
Olympic volleyball players of Japan
People from Asahikawa
NEC Red Rockets players
Pioneer Red Wings players
Place of birth missing (living people)
Asian Games medalists in volleyball
Volleyball players at the 1998 Asian Games
Medalists at the 1998 Asian Games
Asian Games bronze medalists for Japan